The Promenade at Chenal is an upscale, open-air lifestyle center located in Little Rock, Arkansas, at the corner of Chenal Parkway and Rahling Road in Chenal Valley. The Promenade displays French Gothic architecture and was designed to replicate a nostalgic Main Street shopping district. The center features an IMAX theater, Lululemon, Kendra Scott, Sephora, Anthropologie, the state's only Apple Store location, and local merchants among its tenants.

History 
In April 2004, RED Development, LLC announced intent to purchase 38 acres from Deltic Timber Corporation (now PotlatchDeltic) to develop the Promenade in west Little Rock's Chenal Valley. The sale between the two parties was closed in September 2006 and construction began in 2007. The Promenade at Chenal was completed in May 2008, with final construction costing $79 million.

The Promenade was originally planned to be a  center anchored by Dillard's, but due to construction delays, Dillard's did not become a tenant at the Promenade. Original tenants at the Promenade included the state's first IMAX theater and the state's first J. Crew.

In August 2011, Apple opened its first Apple Store location in the state at the Promenade. As of 2022, the Little Rock location is the only Apple Store location in Arkansas. In 2018, AMC Theatres took ownership of the Promenade's Chenal 9 IMAX theater and proceeded with $3 million of renovations to the venue. AMC upgraded the theater's seats and speakers, as well as expanded its concessions.

In December 2019, a non-disclosed private group based out of the Northeast United States announced they had purchased the Promenade and will retain the local group Moses Tucker Partners to manage the site. The next month, Arkasnsas Democrat-Gazette reported the Promenade exchanged owners for $10 cash and other unspecified considerations "in lieu of foreclosure."

Summer of 2021 saw Urban Outfitters open its first Arkansas location at the Promenade. Sullivans Steakhouse opened a Little Rock location at the Promenade in April 2022, with Executive Chef Michael Brown. Arkansas-based and family-run jeweler, Sissy's Log Cabin, chose the Promenade for its sixth location, which opened in July 2022.

See also

References 

Shopping centers in the Little Rock Metro
Shopping malls in Arkansas
Commercial buildings completed in 2008
Buildings and structures in Little Rock, Arkansas
Tourist attractions in Little Rock, Arkansas
Shopping malls established in 2008
Economy of Little Rock, Arkansas
2008 establishments in Arkansas
Lifestyle centers (retail)